John Parris (born 1952), of Forest Hill, London, England, is one of the most renowned manufacturers of handmade snooker cues in the world.

A large number of professional players use John Parris' cues, including Ronnie O'Sullivan, Steve Davis, Tony Drago, Terry Griffiths, Dominic Dale, and Stephen Maguire.

See also 
 Parris Cues

References

External links
 Official Parris website

Snooker people
Cuemakers
Living people
1952 births
Place of birth missing (living people)
People from Forest Hill, London